The 2016 Women's São Paulo Sevens was the second tournament of the 2015–16 World Rugby Women's Sevens Series. It was held between 20 and 21 February 2016 at Arena Barueri in São Paulo, and was the third edition of the Women's São Paulo Sevens as part of the World Rugby Women's Sevens Series.

Format
The teams were drawn into three pools of four teams each. Each team played every other team in their pool once. The top two teams from each pool advanced to the Cup/Plate brackets while the top 2 third place teams also competed in the Cup/Plate. The other teams from each group played play-off for the Bowl.

Teams
The participating teams and schedule were announced on 15 October 2014.

Pool stage

Pool A

Pool B

Pool C

Knockout stage

Bowl

Plate

Cup

References

2015–16 World Rugby Women's Sevens Series
São Paulo Sevens
2016 in women's rugby union
2016 rugby sevens competitions
2016 in Brazilian sport
2016 in Brazilian women's sport